Kenneth Patrick Gamble (born March 8, 1965) is a former American football running back who played for the Kansas City Chiefs of the National Football League (NFL) from 1988 to 1990.  He was an All-American running back for Colgate University and won the first-ever Walter Payton Award as the best player in Division I-AA in 1987. Gamble was elected to the College Football Hall of Fame in 2002. He attended Cushing Academy, a college preparatory school in Ashburnham, Massachusetts.

External links
NFL.com player page

1965 births
Living people
Sportspeople from Holyoke, Massachusetts
American football running backs
Players of American football from Massachusetts
Colgate Raiders football players
Kansas City Chiefs players
College Football Hall of Fame inductees
Walter Payton Award winners